The Employees and Wage-Earners Association is a political party in the Chinese Special Administrative Region of Macau. Macau is a region in which political parties don't play a major role; though some civic groups put forward lists at the elections.

See also
Functional constituency

Political parties in Macau